The Tennessee Walking Horse National Celebration is the oldest breed-specific show for the Tennessee Walking Horse. While it includes over 100 classes, only one horse is selected as World Grand Champion every year. Almost all winners are stallions.

Winners

References

Tennessee Walking Horses
World Grand Champion